Big Horn County School District #3 is a public school district based in Greybull, Wyoming, United States.

Geography
Big Horn County School District #3 serves central and east central portions of Big Horn County, including the following communities:

Incorporated places
Town of Greybull
Unincorporated places
Emblem
Shell

Schools
Greybull High School (Grades 9–12)
Greybull Middle School (Grades 6–8)
Greybull Elementary School (Grades K-5)

Student demographics
The following figures are as of October 1, 2009.

Total District Enrollment: 498
Student enrollment by gender
Male: 252 (50.60%)
Female: 246 (49.40%)
Student enrollment by ethnicity
American Indian or Alaska Native: 1 (0.20%)
Asian: 1 (0.20%)
Black or African American: 1 (0.20%)
Hispanic or Latino: 100 (20.08%)
Two or More Races: 3 (0.60%)
White: 392 (78.71%)

See also
List of school districts in Wyoming

References

External links
Big Horn County School District #3 – official site.

Education in Big Horn County, Wyoming
School districts in Wyoming